Metropoline is an Israeli bus company, which provides bus routes from Beersheba to Tel Aviv and other destinations in the Southern District, Intracity and intercity routes in Ramat HaSharon, Herzliya, Hod HaSharon, Ra'anana, Kfar Saba and other destinations in southern HaSharon. It was founded in 2000 by Tour Bus and two other transportation companies.

In 2002 Metropoline started to operate the intercity routes from BeerSheva to Tel Aviv and other destinations in the Southern District and the intracity service in Arad. In 2010, Metropoline won the tender of Southern HaSharon which contained most intracity and regional service in Ramat HaSharon, Herzliya, Hod HaSharon, Ra'anana and Kfar Saba. In the same year Metropoline started to operate 7 routes that were transferred from Dan, and In early January 2011 Metropoline started to operate the routes that were transferred from Egged that were included in the tender. In 2012, Metropoline won again the tender of the Negev which contained all routes that Metropoline operated in the Southern District.

In July 2017, Metropoline won the tender of Sharon Holon Regional which contains Netanya Tel Aviv routes were operated by Nateev Express, All Egged bus routes in Southern HaSharon, 4 bus routes of Dan in northern Tel Aviv and 4 bus routes of Egged in Holon.

In July 2018, Metropoline started to operate the Netanya Tel Aviv bus routes that were operated by Nateev Express.

In March 2019 Metropoline started to operate 3 bus routes that were operated by Egged with few additional new bus routes.

References

External links

  

Bus companies of Israel
Israeli companies established in 2000
Transport companies established in 2000